The Blagodatnoye mine is one of the largest gold mines in Russia and in the world. The mine is located in Krasnoyarsk Krai. The mine has estimated reserves of 11.39 million oz of gold.

References 

Polyus (company)
Gold mines in Russia
Krasnoyarsk Krai